A ballerina is a principal female dancer in a ballet company.

Ballerina may also refer to:

Films
 Ballerina (1937 film), 1937 film featuring Jeanine Charrat, Mia Čorak Slavenska and Yvette Chauviré
 Ballerina (1950 film), 1950 French film directed by Ludwig Berger
 Ballerina (1956 film), 1956 German film by Georg Wilhelm Pabst
 Ballerina (1966 film), 1966 American/German film
 Ballerina (2006 film), 2006 documentary
 Ballerina (2016 film), 2016 French/Canadian animated film
 The Ballerina (film), 2017 American film
 Ballerina (upcoming film), an upcoming spinoff film in the John Wick franchise

Television
 Angelina Ballerina, a fictional mouse in children's books and a British animated TV series
 Tina Ballerina, a recurring character on The Simpsons

Music
 "Ballerina" (Sidney Keith Russell and Carl Sigman song), a 1947 song covered by many artists
 "Ballerina" (Van Morrison song), a 1968 song on the album Astral Weeks
 "Ballerina (Prima Donna)", a 1983 song by Steve Harley

Other uses
 Ballerina (programming language), a programming language
 Ballerina Stakes, an American Thoroughbred horse race
 Ballerina, a method of growing vines in vineyards